The 1996 Southwestern Bell Cotton Bowl Classic was a college football bowl game played on January 1, 1996, at the Cotton Bowl in Dallas, Texas. This was the 60th held game. The Cotton Bowl Classic was part of the 1995 NCAA Division I-A football season. The bowl game featured the Colorado Buffaloes from the Big Eight and the Oregon Ducks from the Pacific-10 Conference. The game was televised on CBS.

Game summary
Colorado had only a 13–6 halftime lead, but the Buffs scored 25 straight points in the second half while also shutting out Oregon.

References

Cotton Bowl Classic
Cotton Bowl Classic
Colorado Buffaloes football bowl games
Oregon Ducks football bowl games
January 1996 sports events in the United States
1996 in sports in Texas
1990s in Dallas
1996 in Texas